Isdes may refer to:

Isdes is an alternative spelling of Astennu, a figure in Egyptian mythology
Isdes, Loiret is a commune in France